Cautín Province is one of two provinces in the southern Chilean region of La Araucanía (IX), bounded on the north by Arauco and Malleco provinces, on the east by Argentina, on the south by Valdivia Province, and on the west by the Pacific Ocean. Its population at the 2012 census was of 692,582. The most important communes are Temuco, Villarrica, Padre Las Casas, and Nueva Imperial. Cattle, forestry, and agriculture make up most of Cautin's economy. Its climate is humid, rainy in winter, and generally warm in summer.

History
Cautin province once formed part of the territory occupied by the Araucanian natives, and its present political existence dates from 1887. Cautín Province was the last area to be taken by Chile during the occupation of the Araucanía. Cautin is known for the 1971 Agrarian revolt.

Tourism
The province of Cautín is known for its lakes and beaches. Perhaps best known internationally is the town of Pucón with its many recreational amenities on Villarrica Lake under the backdrop of the Villarrica Volcano. South of Villarrica on Calafquén Lake lies Licán Ray, another lakeside resort town. Saavedra is a popular beach on the Pacific coast.

Economy
Cautín lies within the temperate agricultural and forest region of the south, and produces cereal crops such as wheat and oats. In Carahue, the potato cultivation has a significant position. In addition, cattle production is remarkable.

Communes
The province of Cautín is divided into 21 communes (out of the 32 in the region):

 Temuco, provincial capital
 Carahue
 Cholchol
 Cunco
 Curarrehue
 Freire
 Galvarino
 Gorbea
 Lautaro
 Loncoche
 Melipeuco
 Nueva Imperial
 Padre Las Casas
 Perquenco
 Pitrufquén
 Pucón
 Saavedra
 Teodoro Schmidt
 Toltén
 Vilcún
 Villarrica

Geography and demography
It is the third most populated province in the country after Santiago and Concepción. Of these, 449,147 (67.2%) lived in urban areas and 218,773 (32.8%) in rural areas. Between the 1992 and 2002 censuses, the population grew by 15.5% (89,715 persons).

References

 Revolution in Cautín

Provinces of Chile
Provinces of La Araucanía Region